56th Brigade or 56th Infantry Brigade may refer to:

 56th Indian Brigade of the British Indian Army in the First World War
 56th Infantry Brigade (United Kingdom)
 56th Field Artillery Command, a unit of the United States Army 
 56th Infantry Brigade Combat Team, a Texas National guard unit 
 56th Stryker Brigade Combat Team, a Pennsylvania National guard unit

See also
 56th Division (disambiguation)
 56th Group (disambiguation)
 56th Regiment (disambiguation)
 56th Squadron (disambiguation)